Benjamin Semple Chase III (March 18, 1923 – March 6, 1998) was an American football guard who played one season with the Detroit Lions of the National Football League. He played college football at the United States Naval Academy and attended Herbert Hoover High School in San Diego, California. He was a consensus All-American in 1944.

References

External links
 Just Sports Stats

1923 births
1998 deaths
Players of American football from Arizona
American football guards
Navy Midshipmen football players
Detroit Lions players
All-American college football players
People from Bisbee, Arizona